Ancylolomia tripolitella is a species of moth in the family Crambidae described by Hans Rebel in 1909. It is found in Spain and on Sardinia, Malta, and the Canary Islands, in Iran, and in Algeria, Libya, Syria, Jordan and Bahrain.

References

Notes

Moths described in 1909
Ancylolomia
Moths of Europe
Moths of Africa
Moths of Asia